The Mooroolbark Football Club is an Australian rules football club located in Mooroolbark, Victoria. They play in Division 2 of the Eastern Football Netball League.

History
The club was founded in 1965, they have played their entire life in the Eastern Football League.

Premierships
 1988, 2009

VFL/AFL players

 Cooper Fletcher - Richmond
 Sam Mitchell - 
 Cameron Pedersen - , 
 Ryan Bastinac - 
 Heath Hocking - 
 Warren McKenzie (AFL :Carlton, Sydney Swans)

References

External links
 Official Eastern Football League site

Eastern Football League (Australia) clubs
Australian rules football clubs established in 1966
1966 establishments in Australia
Sport in the Shire of Yarra Ranges